Mifflin, Pennsylvania could refer to:
 Mifflin, Juniata County, Pennsylvania
 Mifflin County, Pennsylvania
 West Mifflin, Pennsylvania
 Mifflintown, Pennsylvania
 Mifflinburg, Pennsylvania

See also
 Mifflin Township, Pennsylvania (disambiguation)